The Old Man of the Mountain, is the expression used by Marco Polo in a passage from Book of the Marvels of the World, to indicate Hassan-i Sabbah, the grand master of the Order of Assassins, who took refuge in Alamut Castle. It later became a common name used by the Crusaders.

Subsequently, this nickname was given to various Isma'ili successors of Hassan, in Syria, particularly, for example Rashid al-Din Sinan, the da'i (missionary) and a leader of the Syrian branch of the Nizari Isma'ili state.

References

Bibliography 

 
 
 
 
 
 

Order of Assassins
Marco Polo
Nizari Ismaili state